The Western Kentucky Hilltoppers and Lady Toppers are the athletic teams that represent Western Kentucky University (WKU), located in Bowling Green, Kentucky, in intercollegiate sports as a member of the NCAA Division I ranks, competing in the Conference USA (C-USA) since the 2014–15 academic year. The Hilltoppers and Lady Toppers previously competed in the Sun Belt Conference from 1982–83 to 2013–14; and in the Ohio Valley Conference (OVC) from 1948–49 to 1981–82.

The men's teams use the name Hilltoppers; however, the women's teams use the name Lady Toppers.

Athletic director
On March 12, 2010, Ross Bjork, who was the senior associate athletic director for Development and External Relations for the UCLA Bruins, replaced Dr. Wood Selig, as WKU's athletic director. But in March 2012, Bjork accepted the job as athletic director at Ole Miss. Todd Stewart, who had served as Senior Associate Athletic Director since 2010, was named interim athletic director until May when he was officially named athletic director.

Varsity teams
WKU competes in 16 intercollegiate varsity sports: Men's sports include baseball, basketball, cross country, football, golf and track & field; while women's sports include basketball, cross country, golf, soccer, softball, tennis, track & field and volleyball.

Swimming
On April 14, 2015, WKU announced that it would suspend its men's and women's swimming and diving teams for at least 5 years, effective immediately. This followed a police investigation into claims of assault and hazing by a former men's team member which in turn found multiple violations of university policies on harassment and sexual misconduct.

Basketball
The Western Kentucky Hilltoppers basketball program is nationally recognized, and one of the winningest programs in NCAA history. Rick Stansbury is the current head coach of the Hilltoppers. The program has over 1,600 victories, forty 20-win seasons, 38 Postseason Tournament Appearances and 28 All-Americans.

During the 1980s, Coach Paul Sanderford built Western Kentucky Lady Toppers basketball into a  national power, appearing in 3 NCAA Final Fours. In recent years, the Lady Toppers have had a continued record of success; under  head coach Michelle Clark-Heard, the Lady Toppers won the Conference USA title in 2015, advancing to the NCAA Women's Division I Basketball Championship tournament in 2014 and 2015, and receiving invitations to the Women's National Invitation Tournament in 2013 and 2016. Following the completion of the 2018–2019 season, Michelle Clark-Heard accepted the head coaching position at the University of Cincinnati. The current head coach of the Western Kentucky University Lady Toppers is Greg Collins.

Football
Western Kentucky Hilltoppers football is currently a member of Conference USA.  Previously, the school was a member of the Gateway Conference through the 2006 football season and then began its 2-year transition into becoming a full Division I FBS (formerly Division I-A) member. As a member of Division I-AA, now Division I FCS, the Hilltoppers won a Division I-AA Football Championship in 2002. In 2008, the Hilltoppers were among the Division I-A Independents, along with the Army Black Knights, Navy Midshipmen and the Notre Dame Fighting Irish. In 2009, the Hilltoppers completed the transition and joined the Sun Belt Conference. In 2015, the Hilltoppers clinched the Conference USA championship, won the Miami Beach Bowl and finished ranked 24th in the final Associated Press college football poll.

Following Jeff Brohm's departure to Purdue after back to back Conference USA Titles in 2015 & 2016, Mike Sanford Jr. was hired as his replacement. In his first season, Sanford posted a 6–7 record. His second season saw Western Kentucky finish 3–9, its worst finish since 2010. Shortly following the end of the season, Sanford was relieved of his duties as head coach.

The current head coach is Tyson Helton who came to Western Kentucky after serving one season as the offensive coordinator under Tennessee head coach Jeremy Pruitt.

Baseball
WKU baseball competes at Nick Denes Field. The team won the Sun Belt Conference championship in 2009, their first Sun Belt title.

First Year: 1910
All-Time Record:1736–1448–17 (.545)
Conference Championships: 3 (1952, 80, 2009)
Tournament Championships: 2 (2004, 08)
NCAA Tournaments:4 (1980, 2004, 08, 09)
Postseason Record:6–8 (.429)
Best Record (1980): 47–13–1 (.779)
Best in NCAA's (2009):.3–2 (.600)
Players Drafted:54 (last, Danny Hudzina)

Men's golf
The men's golf team has won 10 conference championships:
Ohio Valley Conference (9): 1949, 1950, 1952, 1953, 1957, 1959, 1965, 1968, 1969
Sun Belt Conference (1): 2006

References

External links